This list includes ministers of the cabinet of Rhodesia from 11 November 1965, the date of Rhodesia's Unilateral Declaration of Independence, to 1979. It includes ministers of Rhodesia's transitional government, which began following the 1978 Internal Settlement and ended with the establishment of Zimbabwe Rhodesia on 1 June 1979. The internal transitional government included the creation of a four-person "Executive Council" and the appointment of black co-ministers to cabinet portfolios.

Cabinet

See also 
 Government of Zimbabwe Rhodesia
 Politics of Zimbabwe

References 

Politics of Rhodesia
History of Zimbabwe
Lists of government ministers of Rhodesia
Cabinets established in 1965
Cabinets disestablished in 1979